Phil Plested is an English singer and songwriter. He has co-written songs for artists including Lewis Capaldi, the Vamps, Little Mix, Kygo, James Arthur, Anne-Marie, and Bastille.

Early life and career 
Plested was born in Watford, Hertfordshire, UK. He studied at Central Saint Martins in London. After leaving school in 2012, he formed a band, Chasing Grace, with his school friends. The band released their debut album Nowhere Near Old Enough in 2015, and were active until 2016. He later transitioned to becoming a songwriter. Plested made his breakthrough as a songwriter in 2016 when he co-wrote the song "Touch" for Little Mix, which peaked at No. 4 on the UK Singles Chart. In 2019, he co-wrote the song "Before You Go" for Lewis Capaldi, and it peaked at number one on the UK Singles Chart as well as on Billboard'''s Mainstream Top 40 and Adult Top 40.

As a solo artist, Plested released his debut album First & Foremost in 2018 with Atlantic Records. 

 Discography 
 Albums 
 First & Foremost As songwriter 

 Awards 
Plested has won the Most Performed Pop Songs of 2021 for Before You Go by American Society of Composers, Authors and Publishers (ASCAP). He has been nominated for British Artist Video of The Year 2018 and British Single Of The Year for Touch'' by The Brits 2018. He has been nominated for British Album of The Year for Lewis Capaldi by The Brits 2020.

References

External links 
 Official website
 
 

English male singer-songwriters
21st-century English male singers
21st-century English singers
English songwriters
Living people
Musicians from Watford
Atlantic Records artists
Year of birth missing (living people)